Atlante Fútbol Club, is a professional football club based in Mexico City, Mexico. Founded in 1916, Atlante were original members of the Mexican Primera División when it began in 1943.

Atlante has won three national league championships, two from their original home in Mexico City, and the most recent following their 2007 relocation to Cancún before eventually returning to Mexico City. They are also three-time winners of the Copa México, and twice winners of the CONCACAF Champions' Cup / CONCACAF Champions League.

Atlante currently compete in Mexico's second-tier Liga de Expansión MX following relegation from Liga MX at the end of the 2013–14 season. They won the Apertura 2021 and Apertura 2022.

History

The beginning
Atlante was founded on April 18, 1916, with the name Sinaloa by a group of young Mexican football enthusiasts, led by Refugio "El Vaquero" Martínez. The team began playing in the La Condesa neighborhood in Mexico City. After changing its name to Lusitania and U-53, Refugio Martínez proposed the name Atlante, after the mighty battles fought at the Atlantic Ocean during World War I.
During the 1920s, players such as the Rosas brothers, Manuel "Chaquetas" Rosas and Felipe "Diente" Rosas, as well as Juan "El Trompo" Carreño, helped Atlante to become one of the most popular teams, mostly among the working classes, which led to its most famous and legendary nickname, El Equipo del Pueblo, "People's team". Atlante's legend Juan Carreño scored Mexico's first goal in the Olympic Games in Amsterdam 1928, as well as Mexico national team's first ever goal in a FIFA World Cup during the inaugural match against France in Uruguay 1930.

Despite its popularity, the Mexican Federation did not allow the team to be involved in the Mexican championship, the Liga Mayor. In order for Atlante to be allowed into the league, it had to win several proof-matches against Toluca and América, two powerful football clubs. The duels were won by Atlante with scores of 7–2 and 2–1, respectively. Accepted within the Liga Mayor, Atlante formed a major rivalry against Necaxa, which became the first classic in Mexican football. The games between these two were furious battles, even drawing in points at the end of the 1931–32 tournament.

During the early years of football in Mexico, when famed foreign teams began to challenge the Mexican teams they swept most clubs except one: Atlante. What many do not recall today is that Atlante was the first Mexican team that acquired national fame by knocking down those foreign "giants". In 1929, Atlante defeated Sabaria of Hungary 3–1. In 1930, Atlante twice defeated Sportivo of Buenos Aires, 2–1 and 3–2. One of their more recalled feats was the 3–2 victory in 1931 over Bella Vista of Uruguay, which had three players from the team that won the first World Cup a year before in Montevideo.

In the 1940s, during the final years of World War II, Atlante's Horacio Casarín began being noticed for his tremendous skill and ability, which also led him to become a major figure in the Mexico national team.

Atlante's popularity, continued to grow after the team was portrayed on the big screen in many films of Mexico's golden era of cinema. Some of those films are "Los Hijos de Don Venancio", "Los Nietos de Don Venancio", "El Vividor", "El que con niños se acuesta", among many others. Players Horacio Casarín and Martí Ventolrà were even part of those films' casting.

Professional era and first championship title
In 1943, the Mexican Federation founded the Professional League with six clubs of the Primera Fuerza of Mexico City, two clubs from the Liga Occidental (Western League) and two members from the Liga Veracruzana (Veracruz League), being Atlante one of those six clubs of Mexico City. Together, they all became what is known today as the Mexican Primera División.

After 4 tournaments, and with the aid of its owner General Jose Manuel Nuñez (a retired militar asked personally by former President Lázaro Cárdenas to watch over the team) as well as of its sensational player Horacio Casarín, the team obtained its first championship in the 1946–47 season. The final match against León was attended by 48,622 people, including the current President Miguel Alemán Valdés (he even got into the field after the match in a famous photograph with the champions). Before that, in 1945 the team imposed the Latin American record for more goals in a single season with 121 goals in 30 matches (more than four goals per game). Atlante also became the first Mexican team to be crowned at the Champion of Champions cup (a super cup scheme championship) during the 1941–42 season.

After the first title, several other teams dominated the championship; nevertheless, Atlante remained as a powerful rival and still a popular team for the working classes, along with its runner-up, Mexican Cup and the Champion of Champions titles in the early 1950s. In 1966, General Jose Manuel Nuñez decided to sell the team to Fernando González, "Fernandón". Poor level and irregular campaigns proceeded the selling, which led Atlante to be relegated from the Primera División to Segunda División in 1976.

The IMSS era
The team managed to return to the Primera División for the 1977–78 season. In October 1978, the Instituto Mexicano del Seguro Social (IMSS) acquired the team in a 100% ownership, promising to make the largest football club in the world with 22 million associates throughout the country. With the financial support of the governmental institution, the team experienced successful campaigns with reinforcements such as the old-time idol Horacio Casarín as head coach and the Mexican football's all-time top goalscorer Cabinho, who would become three-time champion striker with Atlante in 1980, 1981 and 1982. Its productive campaigns led them to the 1981–82 final championship match against Tigres UANL, and after regular and extra time, Atlante became runner-up at penalty kicks. Nevertheless, a year later Atlante won its first continental title with the CONCACAF Champions' Cup against Suriname's Robinhood.

While the government still owned the team, another institution took over the management activities. The Departamento del Distrito Federal, DDF (the former body which controlled the Mexican Federal District) intended to propel the team with little results. After playing for several years at the Estadio Azteca, the team even had to leave this venue and setting its new battleground at the Estadio Ciudad de los Deportes, nowadays Cruz Azul's Estadio Azul.

In 1989, the media broke out with a major news: The DDF sold the team to Jose Antonio García, a businessman owner of the sports' goods & apparel company Garcis. After a failed campaign at a new venue, this time at Querétaro's Estadio Corregidora, the team was relegated, again, to the Segunda División.

Second championship title
Right from its ashes, and back to its homeground Estadio Ciudad de los Deportes, now rebaptized as Estadio Azulgrana, Atlante managed to make an incredible come back to the Primera División, after 3 outstanding games against Pachuca in the final series for the Segunda División Championship. After the series' end, which led to extra time, penalty kicks and sudden death, Atlante's goalkeeper Félix Fernández scored the last penalty kick for a 9–8  final score.

In 1992–93, and guided by Ricardo La Volpe, Atlante obtained its second championship title against Monterrey, with the final match played at Monterrey's stadium, Estadio Tecnológico. Atlante's new legends from that championship title included: 2011 U-17 champion coach Raúl Gutiérrez, Felix Fernández, former Atlante coaches Miguel Herrera, José Guadalupe Cruz, and René Isidoro García, Pedro Massacessi, Wilson Graneolatti, Roberto Andrade, Guillermo Cantú, and feared strikers Luis Miguel Salvador and Daniel Guzmán. The team was crowned as champion for the second time in 45 years. By winning the title, Atlante was again able to access the Concacaf Champions Cup, which eventually was lost against Cartaginés of Costa Rica in the final match.

After winning the championship title, Atlante was eliminated for the next years from the play-off stage, even with important acquisitions such as Hugo Sánchez, Jorge Campos & Venezuelan player Gabriel Miranda, among others. Once again, the team faced relegation issues; therefore, Grupo Televisa decided to acquire Atlante and move it back again to the Estadio Azteca. With this boost, Atlante was able to be reinforced by notable players, such as Zague, Martín Felix Ubaldi, José Damasceno Tiba, and Luis García, as well as the renamed coach Miguel Mejía Barón, who just had a positive result coaching the National team at United States' World Cup 1994. Despite in having memorable campaigns, such as being the first all-championship leader for a short tournament (Invierno 1996), and qualifying for the play-offs in Verano 1997 and Invierno 1997, the team did not accomplished any major results, and even had disastrous moments such as the embarrassing play-off series against Toros Neza in Verano 1997, which was lost in a 9–2 global score.

The third "relegation" era
Several issues occurred in Atlante's history during the last years of the 20th Century, those very issues that were going to define the team's future. Inexperienced head coaches (Zlatko Petricevic, Angel Cappa, Roberto Saporitti and Eduardo Rergis) arriving to the team, weak and vain players, and even a short decision in changing the main uniform's colours of red & blue to orange, made the team and its followers to feel without identity. Fans began switching into other successful teams, and Atlante's local matches began to feel desolated. Awful and boring matches, poorish skill level and players without a real commitment to the team, led Atlante to face again relegation issues to Segunda División, now transformed into Primera División A.

Manuel Lapuente, who had recently succeeded with the National team at France 1998, had the responsibility to guide the team throughout the Verano 2001 tournament and save the team of an imminent relegation: at the end, Lapuente and his players did not accomplished the goal. However, a ray of light appeared, since the Mexican Federation was looking to expand the Primera División with 2 new teams. After paying a 5 million dollar fee, Atlante was allowed to play a promotion-series' matches against the Primera A's runner-up, which turned out to be Veracruz. Atlante won the series 4–1, allowing them to remain at the top division as one of the new expansion teams.

The rebirth of atlantismo
A serious commitment has been taken since then by the directors' board. After breaking up its relationship with Televisa and Alejandro Burillo Azcárraga (owner of telecomm's company Pegaso) being the sole owner, the youth level program has been developed as the main philosophy, which has made Atlante the team with most youth debuts at Primera División since 2000. First Carlos Reinoso, and then Miguel Herrera, both managed to build a new spirited team with its own personality, and with fabulous players such as popular Sebastián "Chamagol" González, Luis Gabriel Rey, and the emblematic goalie Federico Vilar, the team returned to the spotlight of the playoffs, arriving in three quarter-final and two semi-final stages. The team suffered a failed relocation to a different venue, this time to the Estadio Azulgrana Neza 86, and back again to Estadio Azteca.

Former players (now head coaches) René Isidoro García and José Guadalupe Cruz struggled to maintain the spirit, strength, and skill of this Atlante's new era. The lack of assistants to their home matches remained as the major problem of the team, due Mexico City teams' lack of assistance to local matches, as well as both the irregular football level and the lack of identity for the team.

The third crown at Quintana Roo
On May 14, 2007, Atlante officially left the Estadio Azteca because its games there were not profitable. This was largely due to poor attendance at its home matches. They hoped that the move to Estadio Andrés Quintana Roo of Cancún, Quintana Roo, would grow back its popularity and improve attendance. In a fantastic tournament, Atlante adapted quickly to its new venue and began winning important matches, either at home or visiting. Following a tough play-off against Cruz Azul and Guadalajara, Atlante faced Pumas UNAM for the title's final series. On December 9, 2007, only 5 months after arriving at its new venue, and after a great series of matches played by goalie Federico Vilar, as well as remarkable matches of Giancarlo Maldonado, Gabriel Pereyra, Javier Muñoz, José Joel "El Chicharo" González and Clemente Ovalle (who scored the championship goal, 4 minutes before the end of the game), Atlante earned its third championship, growing back its popularity nationwide and especially at its new home city, Cancún.

Atlante won the Apertura 2007 Championship and by doing so, it qualified to the CONCACAF Champions' Cup 2008, where they were eliminated by Costa Rican Saprissa in the quarter-finals. By winning its title, Atlante qualified as well to the SuperLiga 2008, where they were eliminated by the New England Revolution at the semi-final stage. Atlante joined Santos Laguna, Cruz Azul, and Pumas UNAM at the CONCACAF Champions League in its inaugural season 2008–09, where they reached the final match against Cruz Azul. Atlante won the series 2–0, thus being crowned as CONCACAF Club Champion and earning the right to play at the 2009 FIFA Club World Cup in Abu Dhabi, United Arab Emirates.

The return to international spotlight
Along with the FIFA Club World Championship, Atlante was invited to replace Celtic at the Peace Cup in Andalucia, Spain, where it faced Málaga and Aston Villa. Atlante was soon eliminated with a single-goal difference against eventual champions Aston Villa.

Atlante acquired Santiago Solari to reinforce the team. He was the last major figure since Hugo Sanchez's acquisition in 1995, and joined a select group of major international players to play for the club: Grzegorz Lato, Ruben "Ratón" Ayala, Ricardo La Volpe, Cabinho, Miodrag Belodedici, Ilie Dumitrescu, and Faustino Asprilla.

At the 2009 FIFA Club World Cup, Atlante defeated Auckland City 3–0 at the quarter-final stage. For its next stop at semifinals, it faced Barcelona in a curious match featuring two Mexicans with the same name, Rafael Márquez Álvarez of Barcelona and Rafael Márquez Lugo of Atlante, and two teams with the same jersey colors. FIFA eventually ruled out Barcelona to play with the blue-and-red stripes over Atlante. Atlante led the match at the fourth minute, but the final score was a 3–1 defeat. For the third-place match, Atlante was defeated by Pohang Steelers in a penalty shootout, missing two of their four shots, and finishing in fourth place.

Shirt sponsors and manufacturers

Honours

Domestic championships
Primera División: 3
1946–47, 1992–93, Apertura 2007
Runner-up (4): 1945–46, 1949–50, 1950–51, 1981–82

Ascenso MX: 0

Runner-up (1): Apertura 2015

Segunda División: 2

1976–77, 1990–91

National Amateur League: 2
1931–32, 1940–41

Copa México: 3
1941–42, 1950–51, 1951–52
Runner-up (6): 1942–43, 1943–44, 1945–46, 1948–49, 1962–63, Clausura 2013

Campeón de Campeones: 2
1942, 1952
Runner-up (2): 1946–47, 1950–51

Liga de Expansión MX: 2
Apertura 2021, Apertura 2022
Runner-up (1): Guardianes 2020

International championships
CONCACAF Champions' Cup / CONCACAF Champions League: 2
1983, 2008–09
Runner-up (1): 1994

Personnel

Coaching staff

Players

First-team squad

Out on loan

Retired numbers

12 –  Félix Fernández, Goalkeeper (1989–98, 1999–01, 2002–03)

Reserve teams
Atlante Xalapa
 Reserve team that plays in the Liga TDP, the fourth level of the Mexican league system.

Atlante Chalco
 Reserve team that plays in the Liga TDP, the fourth level of the Mexican league system.

Goalscoring champions

Coaches

  Árpád Fekete (1978–79)
  Horacio Casarín (1981–84)
  Juan Carlos Lorenzo (1982), (1983)
  Ignacio Trelles (1983–85)
  José Antonio Roca (1985–87)
  Ricardo La Volpe (1988–89)
  Rafael Puente (1989–90)
  Ricardo La Volpe (July 1, 1991 – Jan 28, 1996)
  Javier Aguirre (Feb 1, 1996 – June 30, 1996)
  Miguel Mejía Barón (1996–98)
  Juan Andrés Sarulyte (1998–99)
  Ángel Cappa (Jan 1, 1999 – June 30, 1999)
  Eduardo Rergis (2000)
  Roberto Saporiti (Sept 21, 2000 – Dec 31, 2000)
  Manuel Lapuente (Jan 1, 2001 – June 30, 2001)
  Carlos Reinoso (2001–02)
  Miguel Herrera (Feb 16, 2002 – June 30, 2004)
  José Guadalupe Cruz (July 1, 2004 – Sept 18, 2005)
  Pedro Monzón (Jan 1, 2005 – June 30, 2005)
  Sergio Bueno (Sept 24, 2005 – Dec 31, 2005)
  René Isidoro García (Jan 1, 2006 – Dec 31, 2006)
  José Guadalupe Cruz (Jan 1, 2007 – June 30, 2010)
  René Isidoro García (July 1, 2010 – Sept 13, 2010)
  Eduardo Bacas (Sept 13, 2010 – Dec 31, 2010)
  Miguel Herrera (Jan 1, 2011 – Dec 31, 2011)
  Mario García (Jan 1, 2012 – April 17, 2012)
  José Luis González (interim) (April 17, 2012 – May 7, 2012)
  Ricardo La Volpe (July 1, 2012 – Jan 28, 2013)
  Daniel Guzmán (Jan 30, 2013 – June 30, 2013)
  Wilson Graniolatti (July 1, 2013 – Sept 2, 2013)
  Andrés Carevic (interim) (Sept 3, 2013 – Sept 8, 2013)
  Rubén Israel (Sept 9, 2013 – Jan 12, 2014)
  Pablo Marini (Jan 13, 2014)
  Gabriel Pereyra /  Gaston Obeledo (2014–2015)
  Wilson Graniolatti (2015)
  Eduardo Fentanes (2015–2017)
  Raúl Gutiérrez (2017)
  Eduardo Rergis (interim) (2017)
  Sergio Bueno (2017–2018)
  Gabriel Pereyra (2018–2019)
  Alex Diego (2019–2020)
  Mario García (2020–)

Champion coaches

References

External links

 Official site
 Primera División
 IASO Team

 
Association football clubs established in 1916
Football clubs in Mexico City
Ascenso MX teams
Liga MX teams
1916 establishments in Mexico
Primera Fuerza teams
CONCACAF Champions League winning clubs